DBApparel, also known as DBA is a group of companies who manufacture well-known brands of clothing (lingerie), and is based in France.

History
The company was formed on 23 September 2005 initially in the 2nd arrondissement of Paris. In 2006 it moved to Levallois-Perret.

Structure
Paul Devin is Managing Director of DBApparel UK (DBA UK), based in Surrey. In 2014, the entire company had around 6,200 employees. DBA is headquartered in Rueil-Malmaison, in the west of Paris, in the Hauts-de-Seine department, where it has been since 2010. The headquarters is situated near Rueil-Malmaison (Paris RER) railway station, the River Seine, and the A86 autoroute (Paris ring-road) near the D186 junction.

The Finance Director of the company is Marcel Nardelli. As at 2019, DBApparel is now a part of Hanesbrands Inc.

Products
It sells men's and women's undergarments, also known as innerwear. For lingerie, it is the market leader in France and Spain, and number two in Italy. It is the market leader for hosiery in France and Germany. It sells underwear in 16 countries.

 Abanderado - Spain
 Lovable - lingerie in Italy
 Nur Die - hosiery in Germany
 Playtex
 Shock Absorber - the no.1 sports bra brand
 Wonderbra
  - hosiery and lingerie

See also
 Triumph International
 UK Lingerie Awards

References

External links
Official Website
Crossdresser Store
Corset & Swimwear

Clothing companies of France
Hosiery brands
Lingerie brands
Companies based in Paris
Hauts-de-Seine
Clothing companies established in 2005
French companies established in 2005